Sasso del Ferro is a mountain of Lombardy, Italy. It has an elevation of 1,062 metres above sea level.

At its base sits the town of Laveno-Mombello, from which the mountain is served by a funicular cable ride to the top. The top of the mountain has a hotel and restaurant popular with tourists, along with a launch board for hang gliders to descend the mountain.

Mountains of the Alps
Mountains of Lombardy